TPS College, Patna also known as Thakur Prasad Singh College is a general degree college in Patna, Bihar, India. It was established to perpetuate the memory of Thakur Prasad in the year 1960. It is the constituent unit of Patliputra University. College offers degrees in Arts, Science and conducts some vocational courses.

History 
When the college was established, it was affiliated with Bihar University. Later on, after the establishment of Magadh University, the college got affiliated to it in 1962. The college was made a constituent unit of Magadh University by the Government of Bihar in 1977. At present, it is a constituent unit of Patliputra University since March 2018.

Degrees and courses 
College offers the following degrees and courses:

 Bachelor's degree
 Bachelor of Arts
 Bachelor of Science
 Master's degree
 Master of Arts
 Master of Science
 Vocational course
 Bachelor of Computer Application
 Bachelor of Business Management
 Bachelor of Science
 Senior secondary
 Intermediate of Arts
 Intermediate of Science

References

External links 

 Official website of college
 Patliputra University website

Constituent colleges of Patliputra University
Educational institutions established in 1960
Universities and colleges in Patna
1960 establishments in Bihar